East Azerbaijan Province ( Āzarbāijān-e Sharqi) is one of the 31 provinces of Iran. It is located in Iranian Azerbaijan, bordering Armenia, Republic of Azerbaijan, Ardabil province, West Azerbaijan province, and Zanjan province. The capital of the province is Tabriz. East Azerbaijan province is in Region 3 of Iran, with its secretariat located in its capital city, Tabriz.

At the 2006 census, East Azerbaijan province's population was 3,527,267 in 911,241 households. The following census in 2011 counted 3,724,620 people in 1,085,455 households. At the 2016 census, the province's population was 3,909,652 in 1,223,028 households.

Geography

The province covers an area of approximately 47,830 km², it has a population of around four million people. The province has common borders with the Republic of Azerbaijan, Armenia and Autonomous Nakhchivan in the north, West Azerbaijan in the west, Zanjan in the south, and Ardabil in the east. A fine network of roads and railways connects East Azerbaijan to other parts of Iran and neighboring countries.

The hills and mountains of the province are divided into three ranges: the Qara Daq Mountains, the Sahand and Bozqoosh Mountains, and the Qaflan Kooh Mountains.

The climate of East Azerbaijan is affected by Mediterranean Continental as well as the cold semi-arid climate. Gentle breezes off the Caspian Sea have some influence on the climate of the low-lying areas. Temperatures run up to 8.9 °C in Tabriz, and 20 °C in Maraqeh, in the winter dropping to −10 to −15 °C at least (depending on how cold the overall year is). The ideal seasons to visit this province are the spring and summer months.

Administrative divisions

At the 1986 census, there were twelve counties in East Azerbaijan province. By the 1996 census, two additional counties had been formed: Jolfa (from part of Marand), and Malekan (from part of Bonab).  Between 1996 and 2002, five new counties were formed: Ajabshir, Azarshahr, Charuymaq, Osku, and Varzaqan. In 2010 Kaleybar was split, with the northern part becoming Khoda Afarin, while the southern part retained the name Kaleybar.

Cities 
According to the 2016 census, 2,809,424 people (over 71% of the population of East Azerbaijan province) live in the following cities: Abish Ahmad 2,715, Achachi 3,647, Ahar 100,641, Ajab Shir 33,606, Aqkand 2,902, Azarshahr 44,887, Bakhshayesh 6,102, Basmenj 12,692, Benab-e Marand 4,311, Bonab 85,274, Bostanabad 21,734, Duzduzan 3,627, Gugan 11,742, Hadishahr 34,346, Hashtrud 20,572, Heris 10,515, Hurand 4,658, Ilkhchi 16,574, Javan Qaleh 700, Jolfa 8,810, Kaleybar 9,324, Khamaneh 3,056, Kharaju 1,824, Kharvana 3,353, Khomarlu 1,902, Khosrowshahr 21,972, Khvajeh 4,011, Kolvanaq 7,465, Koshksaray 8,060, Kuzeh Kanan 4,730, Leylan 6,356, Malekan 27,431, Mamqan 11,892, Maragheh 175,255, Marand 130,825, Mehraban 5,772, Mianeh 98,973, Mobarak Shahr 4,456, Nazarkahrizi 1,215, Osku 18,459, Qarah Aghaj 6,102, Sahand 82,494, Sarab 45,031, Sardrud 29,739, Shabestar 22,181, Sharabian 4,877, Sharafkhaneh 4,244, Shendabad 8,489, Siah Rud 1,548, Sis 6,106, Sufian 9,963, Tabriz 1,558,693, Tark 2,031, Tasuj 7,522, Tekmeh Dash 2,974, Teymurlu 5,375, Torkamanchay 7,443, Varzaqan 5,348, Vayqan 4,678, Yamchi 10,392, Zarnaq 5,343, and Zonuz 2,465.

History

East Azerbaijan is one of the most archaic territories in Iran. During the reign of Alexander of Macedon in Iran (331 BCE), a warrior known as Attorpat led a revolt in this area, then a territory of the Medes, and thereafter it was called Attorpatkan. Since then this vicinity has been known as Azarabadegan, Azarbadgan and Azarbayjan.

Islamic researchers proclaim that the birth of the prophet Zoroaster was in this area, in the vicinity of Lake Orumieh (Chichesht), Konzak City. Needless to say, this province was subject to numerous political and economical upheavals, attracting the interest of foreigners. The Russians in particular have tried to exert a lasting influence in the region over the past 300 years, occupying the area on numerous occasions. The constitutionalist movement of Iran began here in the late 19th century.

Ethnic tensions in Azerbaijan can legally trace their origins back to the colonialist policies of Imperial Russia and later the Soviet Union. In a cable sent on 6 July 1945 by the Central Committee of the Communist Party of the Soviet Union, the local Soviet commander in Russian (northern) held Azerbaijan was instructed as such:

In 1945, the Soviet Union helped set up the Azerbaijan People's Government in what is now East Azerbaijan.

Culture

From a cultural point of view, the most outstanding features are the language, Azerbaijani, and folklore of this region. The language of Azerbaijan is originally "a branch of the Iranian languages known as Azari" (see Ancient Azari language). However, the modern Azeri language is a Turkic language very closely related to the language of Republic of Azerbaijan and Turkey.  Apart from this, the province also boasts numerous learned scholars, gnostics, several national poets such as Mowlana Baba Mazeed, Khajeh Abdol Raheem Aj Abadi, Sheikh Hassan Bolqari, and Abdolqader Nakhjavani, to name a few, and the contemporary poet Ostad Mohammad Hossein Shahriyar. The current leader of Iran, Ali Khamenei, also originally comes from this region.

Iran's Cultural Heritage Organization has registered 936 sites of historical significance in the province. Some are contemporary, and some are from the antiquity of ancient Persia. "Zahak Citadel", for example, is the name of an ancient ruin in East Azerbaijan, which according to various experts, was inhabited from the second millennium BC until the Timurid era. First excavated in the 1800s by British archeologists, Iran's Cultural Heritage Organization has been studying the structure in 6 phases.

East Azerbaijan enjoys a rich compendium of Azeri traditions. Many local dances and folk songs continue to survive among the various peoples of the province. As a longstanding province of Iran, Azerbaijan is mentioned favorably on many occasions in Persian literature by Iran's greatest authors and poets.

East Azerbaijan today

East Azerbaijan province is an industrial centre of Iran. East Azerbaijan province has over 5000 manufacturing units (6% percent of national total). The value of product from these units in 1997 was US$374 million (373 billion rials = 4.07% of the national total). Total investments were valued at US$2.7 billion (2.4513 trillion rials) in 1997.

Some of the major industries in East Azerbaijan are glass industries, paper manufacturing, steel, copper and nepheline syenite, oil refinery, petrochemical processing facilities, chemical products, pharmaceutical processing, foundries, vehicle and auto-parts industries, industrial machines, agricultural machines, food industries, leather, and shoe industries.

East Azerbaijan has an excellent position in the handicraft industry of Iran, which has a large share in the exports of the province. Tabriz carpets are widely known around the world and in international markets for their vibrant designs and colors. At present there are about 66,000 carpet production units in the province, employing some 200,000 people. The annual production of these carpets is roughly 792,000 m², which comprises more than 70% of Iran's carpet exports. 35% of all Iranian carpets are produced in East Azerbaijan. East Azerbaijan province is also one of the richest regions of Iran in natural minerals, with 180 mines in 1997, of which 121 units are currently in operation, and the rest are being planned.

UNESCO has two Biosphere reserves in East Azerbaijan province. One in Lake Urmia and the other at Arasbaran.

Colleges and universities
East Azerbaijan also has some of Iran's prestigious universities including:
 Sahand University of Technology
 Tabriz University of Medical Sciences
 University of Tabriz 
 Azerbaijan University of Tarbiat Moallem
 Tabriz Islamic Arts University
 University of Maragheh
 Engineering and Technical College of Bonab 
 Islamic Azad University of Bonab
 Islamic Azad University of Tabriz
 Islamic Azad University of Shabestar
 Islamic Azad University of Maragheh
 Islamic Azad University of Miyaneh
 University College of Nabi Akram , Tabriz

Notable people
 Qatran Tabrizi, poet
 Ahmad Kasravi, historian
 Samad Behrangi
 Sattar Khan, revolutionary leader
 Bagher Khan, revolutionary leader
 Gayk Bzhishkyan
 Kazem Sadegh-Zadeh
 Parvin E'tesami, poet
 Ali Daei, Iranian soccer player
 Karim Bagheri, soccer star
 Iraj Mirza, poet and politician
 Maqsud Ali Tabrizi
 Ivan Galamian
 Hassan Roshdieh
 Shams Tabrizi, mystic
 Vartan Gregorian, President of Carnegie Corporation
 Ali Salimi
 Ali Soheili, Prime Minister of Iran
 Ebrahim Hakimi, Prime Minister of Iran
 Mahmud Jam, Prime Minister of Iran
 Mohammad Hossein Shahriar
 Asadi Tusi is buried here

See also
 Aras Free Zone
 List of East Azarbaijan cities and towns by population

References

External links

 Official website  
 Cultural Heritage Organization of East Azerbaijan
 The Union for Handwoven Carpets of East Azerbaijan
 Recent Photos from Azerbaijan
 Arasbaran UNESCO Biosphere Reserve
 Lake Urmia UNESCO Biosphere Reserve
 East Azerbaijan Research Park net portal
 Azerbaijan entries in the Encyclopædia Iranica
 Bahram Moshiri's brief talk on Azerbaijan.